BMES (the Biomedical Engineering Society) is the professional society for students, faculty, researcher and industry working in the broad area of biomedical engineering. BMES is the leading biomedical engineering society in the United States and was founded on February 1, 1968 "to promote the increase of biomedical engineering knowledge and its utilization."  There are 7,000 members in 2018.

Since 1972, the society has published an academic journal, the Annals of Biomedical Engineering (online archive).

History 
The BMES was first established in Illinois on February 1, 1968 as a non-profit organization that aims to serve the biomedical engineering students, academics, researchers, and professionals. Upon establishing the organization it first had 171 founding members and 89 charter members. 

The BMES held its first meeting on April 17, 1968 with cooperation of the American Societies for Experimental Biology at the Ritz-Carlton Hotel in Atlantic City, NJ.

References

External links
Engineering Society

Biomedical engineering